Pacific Heights is a 1990 American psychological thriller film directed by John Schlesinger and written by Daniel Pyne. The film stars Melanie Griffith, Matthew Modine, and Michael Keaton. 

Pacific Heights was released in the United States on September 28, 1990. The film received mixed reviews from critics.

Plot
Carter Hayes and Ann Miller are suddenly attacked and beaten by two men. After the men have gone, Hayes calmly tells Ann, "The worst part's over now...."

In San Francisco, unmarried couple Drake Goodman and Patty Palmer purchase an expensive 19th-century polychrome house in the exclusive Pacific Heights neighborhood. They rent one of the building's two first-floor apartments to the Watanabes, a kindly Japanese couple. Soon after, Hayes visits to view the remaining vacant unit and immediately expresses a desire to move in. Hayes drives an expensive 1977 Porsche 911 and carries large amounts of cash on his person, but is reluctant to undergo a credit check. He convinces Drake to waive the credit check in exchange for a list of references and an upfront payment of the first six months' rent, to be paid by wire transfer.

Before any of this money is paid, however, Hayes arrives unannounced one morning and shuts himself in the apartment. As the days pass, Hayes' promised wire transfer fails to materialize. From inside the apartment, sounds of loud hammering and drilling are heard at all hours of the day and night; however, the door is seldom answered. When Drake finally attempts to enter Hayes' apartment, he finds that the locks have been changed. Drake attempts to put an end to the constant noise and drive out Hayes by cutting the electricity and heat to the apartment, but Hayes summons the police, who side with Hayes and reprimand Drake.

Drake and Patty hire a lawyer, Stephanie MacDonald; however, the eviction case is thwarted by Drake's actions. Hayes, safe from eviction for the time being, infests the house with cockroaches, which prompts the Watanabes to move out and pushes Drake and Patty further into debt. The heavy stress takes its toll on the couple; Drake drinks heavily and Patty suffers a miscarriage. Hayes visits the couple to offer his condolences, but an infuriated Drake attacks him and is arrested by the police, whom Hayes had already called to the scene in anticipation of an assault.

The assault allows Hayes to file a civil lawsuit against Drake and, unbeknownst to the couple, assume control of Drake's possessions and identity. Hayes also files a restraining order, which forces Drake from the building. Once Drake is gone, Hayes begins stalking and harassing Patty, in an apparent ploy to lure Drake back to the building in violation of the restraining order. The ploy succeeds, as Drake becomes concerned and comes to check on Patty. Hayes confronts Drake and shoots him, then plants a crowbar at the scene to prevent any criminal charges.

While Drake is in the hospital, the eviction is finally handed down and authorities force entry into Hayes' apartment. By this time however, Hayes has disappeared, and the apartment has been destroyed and stripped bare of all its appliances, light fixtures, wood paneling, and even the toilet. Later, while cleaning out the destroyed apartment, Patty finds an important clue: an old photograph of Hayes as a young boy. Written on the back is the name "James Danforth", which Patty deduces is Hayes' real name. She phones Bennett Fidlow, the Texas attorney whom Danforth had provided as a reference (albeit under his Hayes alias). Fidlow tells her that Danforth has a long history of wrongdoing and has been disowned by his family.

Patty travels to Danforth's last-known address, a condominium in Desert Spring. There she finds Ann, his girlfriend and previous co-conspirator who had earlier come looking for him in San Francisco. Ann tells Patty that Carter Hayes is the name of the property's former landlord, and that Danforth assumed Hayes' identity and took possession of the condominium after (the genuine) Hayes hired two thugs to carry out the assault shown in the film's opening scene. Ann also shows Patty a postcard from Danforth, written on the letterhead of a hotel in Century City, which had just arrived the day before.

Patty tracks down Danforth at the hotel, where he has checked in under Drake's name. Patty bluffs her way into his suite by posing as his wife, and while rummaging through his personal effects she discovers he is using legal and financial documents in Drake's name. She calls Drake and tells him to cancel all of his credit cards and freeze the couple's joint bank account. She then places an exorbitant order for room service, which leads to Danforth being arrested.

Danforth is bailed out of prison by a wealthy widow, Florence Peters, whom he was apparently vetting to be his next victim. Once out on bail, Danforth returns to San Francisco to seek revenge against Patty and Drake. Upstairs, he bludgeons Drake with a golf club, then attacks Patty in the downstairs apartment where she is busy making repairs. A struggle ensues, and a badly-wounded Drake makes his way into the crawl space between the basement and the first-floor apartment. He reaches through a hole in the floor and grabs Danforth by the ankle; Danforth loses his balance and is killed when he falls backward, landing on a water supply line which had been connected to the commode he stole.

Some time later, Patty and Drake have put their newly repaired building up for sale and show the property to another couple. The story ends with the couple having a private discussion about making an offer of $825,000-$850,000, which is $75,000-$100,000 more than what Drake and Patty had originally paid for it.

Cast

Reception

Box office 
The film opened with a gross of $7.1 million from 1,284 theaters, replacing Goodfellas atop the box office.

Pacific Heights grossed $29.4 million in the United States and Canada, and $26 million in other territories, for a worldwide total of $55 million.

Critical response 
On Rotten Tomatoes, 52% of 27 critics gave the film a positive review, with an average rating of 5.2/10. The website's critics consensus reads, "Michael Keaton certainly proves himself as an effective villain, but Pacific Heights sticks too closely to well-worn thriller conventions." On Metacritic, the film has a weighted average score of 55 out of 100, based on 25 critics, indicating "mixed or average reviews". Audiences polled by CinemaScore gave the film an average grade of "B" on an A+ to F scale.

Janet Maslin of The New York Times characterized the film as "perhaps the first eviction thriller," writing that it "taps into a previously unexplored subject, the source of so much excitement and so many conversational gambits within young urban professional circles. It is, of course, real estate." Roger Ebert called the film "a horror film for yuppies", and said the script relied on too many horror clichés. Owen Gleiberman of Entertainment Weekly agreed, writing, "the actors are stranded with a perfunctory, deadwood script that's all concept and no follow-through." Desson Howe of The Washington Post summed up the film this way: "This is a yuppie conceit; this is not interesting to human beings."

Chris Hicks of the Deseret News was among the critics who praised the acting, especially of Keaton, and found enjoyment in having Patty getting her revenge on a man who had manipulated the law to wreck her dreams and hurt the man she loved. In contrast, the Washington Post'''s Howe criticized Modine's acting, remarking that as he "... goes from clean cut boyfriend to arrested, frothing debtor in screen minutes, loses his cool so easily and maniacally, you wonder if he'll turn out to be the real psycho."

This film was listed as No. 93 on Bravo's The 100 Scariest Movie Moments''.

Location
The story location for the film is the Pacific Heights area of San Francisco. However, the actual film location for Drake and Patty's house is in Potrero Hill in San Francisco, specifically at the corner of 19th and Texas Street. Other portions of the film were shot in Palm Springs, California.

Home video 
The film was released on VHS by CBS/Fox Video on March 21, 1991. It was then released on DVD by Warner Home Video on August 31, 1999. It was most recently released on Blu-ray by Sony Pictures Home Entertainment on July 23, 2019.

TV series 
A TV series adaptation was confirmed by Morgan Creek Entertainment to be in the works with "a surprising and cheeky gender role reversal."

See also

 List of films featuring home invasions

References

External links

 
 
 

1990 films
1990s psychological thriller films
20th Century Fox films
American psychological thriller films
Films scored by Hans Zimmer
Films about con artists
Films directed by John Schlesinger
Films produced by Scott Rudin
Films set in apartment buildings
Films set in Los Angeles
Films set in San Francisco
Films shot in San Francisco
Films shot in Los Angeles
Home invasions in film
Morgan Creek Productions films
1990s English-language films
1990s American films